Cheng Yu (141 – December 220), originally named Cheng Li, courtesy name Zhongde, was a Chinese politician who lived during the late Eastern Han dynasty of China. He was an adviser to Cao Cao, the warlord who became the de facto head of the Han central government during that period. He died in December 220 – soon after Cao Cao's son, Cao Pi, usurped the throne from Emperor Xian (the last Han emperor) and established the state of Cao Wei, an event marking the start of the Three Kingdoms period in China. Cheng Yu was described as a tall man (approximately 1.91 metres) with a beautiful long beard. He was from Dong'e County in present-day Shandong. He is often remembered for a possibly fictional event, where he uses sadistic and unusual tactics to cope with a shortage of grain. Instead of sending hostages to Cao Cao's rival, Yuan Shao, in exchange for food supplies, he advised Cao Cao to feed his army with human flesh. He was also noted for his expertise in military tactics, which helped Cao Cao defeat Yuan Shao at the Battle of Guandu in 200 and consolidate control over northern China. It is widely agreed that his numerous contributions laid the foundation of the Cao Wei state; it is theorized that the reason he was not made one of the Three Ducal Ministers when Cao Pi became emperor in late 220 was only because of his aforementioned strategy to cope with the food shortage in Yan Province. After Cheng Yu's death, Cao Pi honoured him with the posthumous title "Marquis Su", meaning "solemn marquis".

Incidents in hometown
Cheng Yu's original given name was "Li" but he changed it to "Yu" (昱; literally "lifting the sun") after he had a dream about the sun on top of Mount Tai. He was from Dong'e County, which is in present-day Shandong. There is nothing recorded in history about his early life; he was known for his courage in the areas around his hometown when he was in his early 40s. When the Yellow Turban Rebellion broke out in the 180s, a county magistrate, Wang Du, burnt down the food stored in the warehouse and instigated his subordinates to seize the city. The county prefect escaped the city and went into hiding, while the town residents took their families eastward and camped beside a mountain. After receiving intelligence from his spies that Wang Du had moved out and camped 1.3 to 1.6 miles away from the city, Cheng Yu reported to and told a local parvenu, Xue Fang, that Wang Du must not have the ability to control the situation, so they should retrieve the prefect and reoccupy the city. Xue Fang agreed to Cheng Yu's plan, yet the commoners refused to comply, wherein Cheng Yu angrily said: "Stupid commoners lack the ability to plan." He then plotted with Xue Fang, and secretly sent several cavalry holding streamers to the hilltop, where they rode down toward the civilians. Xue Fang and his men then screamed upon seeing the riders, making the commoners mistake them for Yellow Turban rebels. Led by Xue Fang, the mass kept running until back into the city, where they realised that the rebels were not so terrifying and started to defend the city with the prefect, whom Cheng Yu found later.

Seeing the inhabitants had come back, Wang Du launched an attack, but was foiled by Cheng Yu's defences. After some time, Wang Du could no longer hold on and intended to move elsewhere. Cheng Yu then led a sudden attack when Wang Du was packing, dealing him a major blow which enabled the survival of Dong'e County.

In 192, Liu Dai, the Inspector of Yan Province, invited Cheng Yu to join his administration but Cheng Yu refused. At the beginning, Liu Dai had very good relationship with the warlords Yuan Shao and Gongsun Zan, wherein Yuan Shao sent his family to reside with Liu Dai while Gongsun Zan sent a detachment of elite cavalry to help Liu Dai fight the Yellow Turbans in the area; however, Yuan Shao and Gongsun Zan became bitter enemies later, and were way more powerful than Liu Dai, who was forced to pick a side. Liu Dai then sought advice from Cheng Yu, who told the former that asking for help from Gongsun Zan was like requesting someone to save a drowning child from afar. He further analysed that Gongsun Zan, who had recently gained a minor military victory over Yuan Shao, would eventually lose to the latter. Therefore, it was not wise to enjoy a short-term benefit without a careful long-term plan. Liu Dai agreed with Cheng Yu's speech and severed ties with Gongsun Zan, who ordered his cavalry in Yan Province to return to his base in You Province. Just as Cheng Yu had predicted, Gongsun Zan soon suffered a heavy defeat by Yuan Shao before his cavalry could even join the battle. Liu Dai then asked Cheng Yu to become his officer, and offered him the position of a Cavalry Commandant, but Cheng Yu again refused employment.

Coming to serve Cao Cao
However, without the assistance from Gongsun Zan's elite cavalry, Liu Dai was soon killed by the Yellow Turbans, and Cao Cao came forth to take over the province. Upon his arrival, Cao Cao sent Cheng Yu a letter concerning his presence in the government. Cheng Yu replied to Cao Cao that he accepted the offer right away, so the commoners asked Cheng Yu: "How can you change your attitude so snobbishly?" Cheng Yu laughed at them without comment. When Cheng Yu joined Cao Cao, he was only assigned as a prefect, a position far lower than the ones Liu Dai offered him in the past. Still, Cheng Yu was determined to follow Cao Cao, as evidenced by his defences against the warlord Lü Bu, who attacked Cao Cao's base while the latter was away on a campaign in Xu Province.

Performance in Lü Bu's invasion
When Lü Bu claimed his rule over Yan Province, many people gave up resistance and joined him; only Juancheng, Dong'e and Fan counties did not yield. At the time, Cheng Yu was guarding Juancheng with Cao Cao's chief strategist, Xun Yu, who analysed that the defences could only be successful if the officials guarding the three counties worked together. Xun Yu then asked Cheng Yu to oversee the defence of Dong'e County because he could probably convince his hometown to fight with him. Thus, Xun Yu stayed behind to watch over the fortress, and Cheng Yu went to Dong'e County. On his way, Cheng Yu passed by Fan County, where Si Yi, an official under Lü Bu, was trying to persuade the prefect of Fan County to switch allegiance to his lord. Cheng Yu sought a meeting with the prefect and managed to persuade him to reject and kill Si Yi. When he arrived at Dong'e County, Xue Ti and Zao Zhi had already set up defences around the area, so Cheng Yu split his cavalry force out to take control of Cangting ford to block the advances of Lü Bu's strategist, Chen Gong. Xue Ti then formulated a strategy with Cheng Yu, which enabled the defences of the three counties until Cao Cao returned from Xu Province.

The year 194 was a hard time for Cao Cao, because in addition to losing several battles to Lü Bu around Puyang, a widespread famine also broke out in Yan Province (but this also forced Lü Bu to retreat). For once, Cao Cao thought about relinquishing his position in Yan Province, and prepared to surrender to Yuan Shao. Nevertheless, Cheng Yu rebuked Cao Cao by saying that he had a calibre greater than just being a subject under Yuan Shao, and it was shameful for a genius to submit to a man who only enjoyed an overvalued fame. Cheng Yu said to Cao Cao: "Even a mere warrior like Tian Heng knew about shame, how could you act so shamefully to surrender to Yuan Shao?" However, Cheng Yu's heroic speech was way easier to say than to do, because Cao Cao's army had already been running out of food. Nevertheless, not wanting to be disgraced, Cao Cao appeared to listen to Cheng Yu, but asked him to prepare three days' worth of supplies. Unprepared to be asked to deal with this problem, Cheng Yu insanely devised a very vicious strategy: he personally led an armed force to pillage his hometown and abducted his townsfolk, who would then be slaughtered like pigs for Cao Cao's army to feed on.

Liu Bei's betrayal
After Lü Bu was forced to abandon Yan Province, Cheng Yu and Xun Yu advised Cao Cao to escort Emperor Xian, who was in dire straits, into territory under Cao Cao's control. After Emperor Xian made it to Xuchang (Cao Cao's base) from Luoyang, Cheng Yu was appointed as a Master of Writing in the Han central government but was soon promoted to be East General of the Household and appointed as the Administrator of Jiyin Commandery. In 198, Lü Bu took Xu Province from Liu Bei, who surrendered to Cao Cao for protection. Cheng Yu told Cao Cao that Liu Bei was an ambitious man with many admirers and that he would not be a subject for long, so he should be taken care of as soon as possible. Cao Cao refused under the rationale that he did not want the death of one individual to affect the decision of others who might yield to the Han central government.

The following year, Cao Cao, Sun Ce and others defeated the warlord Yuan Shu, who then attempted to head north to join his half-brother, Yuan Shao. Liu Bei volunteered to intercept Yuan Shu and was granted a sizable army to do his job. When Cheng Yu heard the news, he rushed to Cao Cao and protested: "It's arguable you turned down our suggestion to kill Liu Bei earlier, but it's a certainty that he will betray you if lent a force." Thus, Cao Cao regretted his decision and sent an envoy to call the troops back, but it was already too late. Liu Bei led his army east to Xu Province, killed Che Zhou (車胄; the provincial governor appointed by Cao Cao) and seized control of the province.

Cao Cao's northern campaign
When Yuan Shao defeated Gongsun Zan and congregated the four provinces north of the Yellow River, he assembled an army of over 100,000 to declare war against Cao Cao. Cheng Yu was made a general and was stationed in Juancheng with 700 soldiers. Cao Cao then sent a letter to Cheng Yu and asserted to Cheng Yu that he would send 2,000 men as reinforcements. However, Cheng Yu replied: "Yuan Shao has 100,000 men and considers himself invincible. If he sees I only have such a small army, he will not attack easily. On the contrary, if my position is strong (enough to threaten his movement), then he will not be able to pass me by without attacking; if he attacks, he'll surely win, so it will be a mere waste to send in reinforcement. I hope you could understand my rationale and don't doubt on that." Cao Cao was happy that he did not need to send additional troops to Cheng Yu, and was able to defeat Liu Bei in Xu Province within a short time.

Three years after Cao Cao defeated Yuan Shao at the Battle of Guandu, Cheng Yu recruited and enlisted several thousand robbers and inhabitants of deep hills around Yan Province, and led them to rendezvous with Cao Cao in Liyang, where Cao Cao had set up a front line military operation base against Yuan Tan and Yuan Shang. Along with Li Dian, Cheng Yu transported grain to Cao Cao by ships. Once, the supply line was blocked by Gao Fan, the Administrator of Wei Commandery, who capitalised on the geographic advantage. Cao Cao then ordered Cheng Yu to abandon the waterway and transport through other routes. However, Li Dian reasoned with Cheng Yu that Gao Fan could be defeated because he was lightly guarded with a small army. Therefore, they violated Cao Cao's order, and landed the northern bank and defeated Gao Fan, resulting in the smooth delivery of military necessities.

After the defeat of Yuan Tan and Yuan Shang, Cheng Yu was made General Who Uplifts Military Might (奮武將軍) and Marquis of Anguo (安国亭侯).

Battle of Red Cliffs
In 208, Cao Cao accepted the surrender of Liu Cong, the governor of Jing Province, and sent a letter to the eastern warlord, Sun Quan, to inform the latter that he had assembled an 800,000 strong force in Jiangling, and was eager to meet Sun Quan in person. The majority believed that Sun Quan would surely kill Liu Bei and submit to Cao Cao, but Cheng Yu correctly analysed that Sun Quan would support Liu Bei to fight a desperate war. However, due to the fact that Cao Cao enjoyed an absolute advantage both in terms of military and economy; therefore he did not take Cheng Yu's counsel seriously, and Cao Cao held lavish banquets on his warships from time to time. Out of negligence, none of Cao Cao's officers knew that the wind direction would change a few days per year along the Yangtze River, and so they thought that the direction of the wind gave Cao Cao's side the advantage. While Cao Cao was certain that the allied forces could not make use of a fire attack, nevertheless the enemy commander, Zhou Yu, had Cao Cao's grand fleet reduced to ashes overnight.

Advice to Cao Pi
When Cao Cao went west to fight against Ma Chao and Han Sui, Cheng Yu was assigned as a strategist to Cao Cao's son Cao Pi, who was in charge of the capital. During the time that Cao Cao went west, some local gentries in Hejian Commandery rebelled. When Cao Pi sent a general to subdue the revolt, several thousand rebels offered to surrender after being besieged. A meeting was held within the court to decide whether the surrender of the rebels should be accepted or not. Many participants of the discussion proposed to reject the surrender, because Cao Cao once issued a fiat that those who surrendered after being besieged should be executed. Cheng Yu opposed and said, "The reason why Cao Cao set such an expedient rule was that he was fighting against numerous enemies in a chaotic time. To execute those who surrender after being besieged could intimidate other potential enemies, and encouraged early submissions; subsequently, we did not need to lay siege every time. However, the territory under our control is now stabilised, and this battle happens within our own domain; so therefore these kinds of enemies will surely surrender, and killing them will not threaten other enemies. Thus, to kill the rebels now is not the primary focus of Cao Cao's rule. I suggest that their surrender be accepted; if you must execute them, then please inform master Cao first." The feckless audience simply ignored Cheng Yu's rationale, and vindicated their choice by claiming that they had the autonomy over military issues and that it was not necessary to report every single provision. Cheng Yu remained in silence and the officers left the meeting. After the exodus, Cao Pi specifically consulted Cheng Yu to see if he held any thought back in the discussion, wherein Cheng Yu replied, "The reason why Commandants and Commanders were given autonomic power is because frontline military issues are so imminent that decisions must be made immediately. But the surrendered rebels are enfettered by your general, and have no way to mutiny. That is why I don't want to see you use (abuse) your authority. Feeling delighted by Cheng Yu's support, Cao Pi changed his mind and reported the issue to Cao Cao, who ordered the surrendered rebels to be spared. As Cheng Yu expected, the bond between Cao Pi and his father, Cao Cao was strengthened as a result of their correspondence. After Cao Cao returned from his expedition, he particularly expressed his gratitude to Cheng Yu by claiming Cheng Yu to be an intelligent man who not only excelled in tactics but also knew how to manage the relationship between father and son.

Later life and death
Cheng Yu went into semi-retirement after losing to his political rival, Xing Zhen (邢貞). What was worse for him was that much invectives were done to Cheng Yu after his downfall, and someone even accused him of harbouring the intention of rebelling, but Cao Cao did not further investigate his once trusted aide; in contrast, he gave Cheng Yu more monetary rewards. Cheng Yu remained as a commoner and seldom left his home until Cao Pi usurped the throne from Emperor Xian in late 220. Cheng Yu was re-instituted as the Minister of the Guards and earned a tax revenue from a marquisate composed of 800 taxable households. Since Cao Pi intended to make Cheng Yu one of the Three Ducal Ministers when he became emperor in late 220, a discussion was made in regard to the issue. However, Cheng Yu died before the decision would be settled. He was given the posthumous title "Marquis Su" for his inviolable reverence (See Xing Zhen's case in the following section). Both his young son Cheng Yan and grandson Cheng Xiao were made Marquis, and Cheng Yu was succeeded by his eldest son, Cheng Wu after death. His grandson Cheng Xiao became a well-known scholar later.

Appraisal
Despite being famous for his paradoxes, Cheng Yu tended to belittle others in his speeches. For once, he inveighed Cao Cao as inferior to the likes of Tian Heng, who was a mere warrior, when he tried to dissuade Cao Cao from surrendering to Yuan Shao. He also used to call his townsfolk "stupid commoners".

Cheng Yu was a recalcitrant old man, and his hidebound characteristic compelled him to quarrel with others on a frequent basis. There is a quaint incident about how he entered a predicament when he offended Xing Zhen. When Cao Cao was first enfeoffed as a vassal by Emperor Xian, he appointed Cheng Yu as the Minister of the Guards in his vassal state, while Xing Zhen was appointed as the Commandant of the Capital. However, Cheng Yu had a rabid quirk in pontificating his dominance, and he purposely flaunted in front of Xing Zhen, who reported his invidious behaviour to Cao Cao. As punishment, Cheng Yu was stripped of his position.

Although ingeniously intelligent, Cheng Yu was of a perverse and hardhearted nature. As a possibly fictional annotation recounts, he once ransacked his hometown, Dong'e County, and kidnapped his own townfolk to feed Cao Cao's army in an act of cannibalism. It was recorded that Cheng Yu would have the abducted cut into pieces to mix with rice, so the soldiers would enjoy their prized meals.

In Romance of the Three Kingdoms
In the 14th-century historical novel Romance of the Three Kingdoms, Cheng Yu offered a ruse in order to get Xu Shu to serve Cao Cao. At the time Xu Shu was serving as rival Liu Bei's key strategist and managed to score a major victory against Cao Cao's officers Lü Kuang, Lü Xiang and Cao Ren. Exploiting the fact that Xu Shu was an extremely filial son, Cheng Yu suggested to Cao Cao that Cao Cao hold Xu Shu's mother hostage and force Xu Shu to leave Liu Bei and serve Cao Cao. Cheng Yu wrote a fake letter to Xu Shu and successfully tricked Xu Shu to come to Xuchang. Ironically, Xu Shu's mother committed suicide after seeing her son fall for such a ruse and leaving a righteous person like Liu Bei to serve under the ruthless Cao Cao. Prior to the Battle of Red Cliffs, Cheng Yu had predicted that Sun Quan's forces would use fire to attack Cao Cao's naval fleet. However, Cao Cao did not heed his advice seriously as the winds were to their advantage then. After Cao Cao's major defeat, Cheng Yu was one of the few advisers who stood by Cao Cao all the way during their escape.

See also
 Lists of people of the Three Kingdoms

Notes

References

 Chen, Shou (3rd century). Records of the Three Kingdoms (Sanguozhi).
 
 Luo, Guanzhong (14th century). Romance of the Three Kingdoms (Sanguo Yanyi).
 Pei, Songzhi (5th century). Annotations to Records of the Three Kingdoms (Sanguozhi zhu).

141 births
220 deaths
Han dynasty politicians from Shandong
Cao Wei politicians
Officials under Cao Cao
Politicians from Liaocheng
Political office-holders in Shandong